Agnosia orneus is a species of moth of the family Sphingidae first described by George Hampson in 1907. It is known from India.

References

Smerinthini
Moths described in 1907
Moths of Asia